Valet parking is a parking service offered by some restaurants, stores, and other businesses. In contrast to "self-parking", where customers find a parking space on their own, customers' vehicles are parked for them by a person called a valet. This service either requires a fee to be paid by the customer or is offered free of charge by the establishment.

Explanation
A valet is usually an employee of the establishment or an employee of a third-party valet service. When there is a fee, it is usually either a flat amount or a fee based on how long the car is parked. It is customary in the United States to tip the valet who actually parks the car. Valet parking is most often offered (and is most useful) in urban areas, where parking is scarce, though some upscale businesses offer valet parking as an optional service, even though self-parking may be readily available. For example, in wealthy suburban areas like California's Silicon Valley, some hospitals (like Stanford University Medical Center) offer valet parking for the convenience of patients and their visitors.

Some cars come with an additional key, known as a valet key, that starts the ignition and opens the driver's side door, but prevents the valet from gaining access to valuables that are located in the trunk or the glove box.

Efficiency

The main advantage of valet parking is convenience. Customers do not have to walk from a distant parking spot carrying heavy loads. Many disabled drivers rely on valet parking when they can't walk from and to a distant parking spot. Likewise, people who do not have time to search for a parking spot can valet park without the hassle. Valet parking is especially convenient in bad weather. Most professional valet attendants are well insured, and knowledgeable about nearly every make and model of car and their quirks; including aftermarket alarm systems, and keyless ignitions.

An advantage of valet parking is that it is possible to pack more cars into a given physical space, in what is generally known as "stack parking". The valet holds all the keys and can park the cars two or more deep, as they can move cars out of the way to free a blocked-in car.

Another type of stacking is called lane stacking. This method is useful for events where guests all arrive around the same time, such as for a wedding reception. The point of this procedure is to keep the lane (or lanes) of incoming traffic flowing forward so that guests are spared a long wait time for valet service. This method is usually accomplished by designating one or two of the valets to be "stackers", who simply "push" each car up fifty feet or so and prepare it for a quick "takeaway" for a returning valet to park. The process is then repeated until all cars are parked, utilizing as much lane space as possible, meanwhile keeping the lanes moving.

An additional advantage of valet parking, aside from stacking, is that valets can park cars closer and straighter than some customers may park.  This will save the space in the parking lot or garage, and prevent the inconvenience of going to different floors by cramming everything in.

An efficient valet service will implement (or at least prepare) a system to handle the expected number of cars and guests. This may include, but is not limited to, any of the following: designated greeters, stackers, and parkers, a system for marking car locations, and sometimes even a shuttle service for valets at large venues in order to expedite car return times at the end of the event.

Luxury

Valet parking also adds a touch of luxury compared to self-parking. Many locations and events that provide valet parking provide extra touches such as bringing the car up front, having the doors opened for the guest, and in rare cases cleaning and detailing of the vehicle.

Venues
As described above, several different types of venues offer valet parking. These include:
Single event: These valets are usually hired for just the evening and have assigned roles for efficiency. Parking may be at an off-site location that can handle many cars and can range from a dirt field to a multi-story parking lot. It might also be in the streets near the pickup location. At a wedding the cars may be stacked in order, respecting the hierarchy of importance of the visitors. For instance, at a Middle Eastern oil company executive party, the vehicles might be stacked in the order of the importance of the executives of the company.
Restaurant or bar location: In this setting, parking is usually in the establishment's own lot, but may also be a blocked-off section of a nearby parking house or multilayer lot. Often a dozen spots in front will be reserved for the big spenders or frequent visitors. When the restaurant is not busy, the nicest, most unusual or newest vehicles will be parked in front of the restaurant. This can be a sales and marketing stipulation. Restaurants trying to attract tourists may park rental vehicles or common vehicles in front. Expensive restaurants looking to attract less frugal customers may park expensive cars in front, including those of the restaurant employees or owners. 
Bar or crowded urban setting: Here, space is a premium, yet the cars on the street may have a huge bearing on the clientele inside.
Hotel location: Hotels can have all types mentioned above. Lots, multi-layer lots, parking houses, hydraulic structures, parking in front, parking in back, shuttles for car owners, shuttles for valets and more. The biggest difference between hotels and other types is the cost. Hotels usually charge double or more for valet parking when compared to bars, restaurants and major events. Usually this is because of a captive market and the need for overnight parking.
Airports: In the United Kingdom, companies have offered valet parking at airports. The service is also offered when parking at an airport hotel.
Casinos: The major casinos in the U.S., particularly those in Las Vegas, Atlantic City, Niagara Falls and most larger Native American casinos provide either free or low-cost valet parking.
Hospitals
Malls: Major shopping centers with high traffic volume often results in full parking facilities. Some malls offer valets (with fees) to park the vehicle at a temporary location or a reserved lot. Keys are given to the valet and a ticket is issued to the driver. Upon the return of patron, the valet will drive the vehicle back to the valet booth. Temporary mall parking valets may be found during major holiday periods, like Christmas.

Valet parking equipment
Common valet parking equipment includes articles such as valet podiums and key boxes for storing and protecting keys and valet tickets which are used to keep track of keys and their corresponding vehicles. Some valet parking providers also use specially designed umbrellas and signs to direct customers or display prices.

Bike valet

In some urban areas where parking is exceptionally scarce, events and universities sometimes sponsor a valet parking service for bikes. This service is normally free of charge and offered to encourage riding a bike to the location.

Motocycle Valet Parking

Motocycle valet parking can be found in the city of Surakarta, Indonesia, Including Valet Parking service for Motorcycle for the first time in the world, Can be found at Pasar Gede, Pasar Singosaren, Pasar Sidodadi, Pasar Kleco, Pasar Klewer.

See also
Valet boy
Valet

References

Parking
Customer service